Magnet is an unincorporated community in southeast Wharton County, Texas, United States. The rural community is situated at the intersection of State Highway 60 (SH 60) and County Road 102 a short distance north of the Matagorda County line. Founded in the first decade of the 20th century by a land developer, the town prospered for a time but eventually lost its school, post office, railroad and businesses. Magnet is identified by road signs on SH 60 and by a tall broadcasting tower. A nearby oil field takes its name from the community.

History
In 1911, Frank D. and Fred Fowler began selling 12,000 acres, promoting the area's rich soil. The same year a post office was opened. According to one story, the town was named Magnet because the good soil would draw potential farmers. Another account claimed it was because saloons there would attract drinkers from Bay City, which was dry. In 1912 the new town boasted a few grocery stores plus a drugstore, gristmill, hotel, lumberyard and school. Within two years, there were forty persons living in Magnet alongside a blacksmith shop, canning factory, cotton gin, garage, two general stores, rice grower, and the Truck Growers Association. In 1925, the first producing oil well in Wharton County was drilled in the Boling Field near Iago. This started a 1920s oil drilling boom during which the Magnet Withers Field was first exploited.

By the 1930s there were 50 residents of Magnet. The discovery of additional nearby oil in 1937 did not increase the population. By 1943 the post office operated out of the sole remaining commercial establishment in the community. By 1949 there were only 20 persons in Magnet and the post office closed in 1954. Between 1968 and 2000 the population was 42. In the latter year no businesses were reported in Magnet. In 2004, the BNSF Railway applied to discontinue  of the line from Bay City north to Cane Junction and then northeast to Newgulf on the grounds that there had been no rail traffic for two years. This stretch of track included Magnet. In 2012 Milagro Oil and Gas, Inc. drilled three successful wells in the Magnet Withers field.

Geography
There are about two dozen homes clustered at Magnet and along Mauldin Road which goes to the northeast. The Magnet Baptist Church is located on County Road 102 in the community. The community gives its name to the Magnet Withers oil field.

Education
By 1912 there was a school in Magnet. In 1926, the Magnet school employed three teachers to instruct 130 white and five black students. A 1936 map depicted two schools. The schools became part of the Wharton Independent School District in 1947.

References

Unincorporated communities in Wharton County, Texas
Unincorporated communities in Texas